Yulia Antonovna Putintseva (puh-TEEN-tseh-vah; born 7 January 1995) is a Russian-born Kazakhstani professional tennis player. She is a three-time Grand Slam quarterfinalist (twice at the French Open and once at the US Open), and she achieved her career-high singles ranking of world No. 27 in February 2017. So far, she has won two singles titles on the WTA Tour. Before June 2012, she played for her country of birth, Russia.

Personal life
Yulia Putintseva was born to Anton Putintsev and Anna Putintseva, and has a brother named Ilya. Born in Moscow, she currently resides in Boca Raton, Florida. She was introduced to sport by her father. She liked it and was soon practising at Spartak Club in Moscow. Later, she moved to Paris to attend Mouratouglou Academy after winning a big Under 14s event. Her favourite surface is clay, while her favourite tournaments are Australian Open and US Open. Tennis idols were Martina Hingis and Justine Henin. She also enjoys dancing, music, singing, Sudoku, playing cards and chess. As of the start of June 2012, she represents Kazakhstan.

Junior career

Putintseva was successful as junior. She is former No. 3 junior player, that she achieved on the 21 May 2012. Putintseva began playing on the ITF Junior Circuit in 2008 at the age of 13. In May 2009, she won her first junior title at the Grade 2 International Junior Tournament Citta' Di Prato in Prato in singles event. The following week, she won Grade 1 International Junior Tournament "Citta' Di Santa Croce" in Santa Croce, also in singles. She then played at the Grade A Trofeo Bonfiglio, but lost to Sloane Stephens in the first round. She continued with good results, and reached two Grade 1 singles finals, but won only one of them. At the 2009 US Open, she made her Grand Slam debut and also recorded her first Grand Slam win, defeating Anna-Lena Friedsam. Later, she reached final of Grade 1 Kentucky International Junior Tennis Derby, but lost to Zheng Saisai. In December 2009, she played at the Grade A Dunlop Orange Bowl, where she lost in the third round to Ajla Tomljanović.

In 2010, Putintseva continued to rise. She started year with quarterfinal of the Grade 1 Loy Yang Traralgon International. After the Australian Open second-round loss, she finished as runner-up at the Open International Juniors de Beaulieu sur Mer. Soon after that, she won Grade 2  International Junior Tournament Citta' Di Prato, that was her second title there. She then reached two Grade 1 semifinals. At Wimbledon, she reached her first Grand Slam semifinal, but then lost to Kristýna Plíšková. In August, she played for Russia at the Youth Olympic Games and reached quarterfinal. She then reached semifinal of the Grade 1 Canadian Open Junior Championships. In early September, she played her first Grand Slam final at the US Open, but lost to compatriot Daria Gavrilova. In November, she reached final of the Grade-1 Eddie Herr International Junior Tennis Championships. In December, at the Dunlop World Challenge, she reached quarterfinals, getting one step further than previous year.

In 2011, Putintseva was not less successful than in the previous years. She started year with the final of the Grade-1 Loy Yang Traralgon International, where she lost to Monica Puig. It followed the third round of the Australian Open and quarterfinals at the French Open. She then had a successful grass-court season, finishing runner-up at the Grade-1 Junior International - Roehampton and as quarterfinalist of Wimbledon. At the US Open, she reached her third Grand Slam quarterfinal of the year. In early December, she won the Grade-1 Eddie Herr International Junior Tennis Championships, defeating compatriot Victoria Kan in the final. She finished year with the final of the Dunlop World Challenge, where she lost to Anett Kontaveit.

2012 was her last season as junior. She started year with the semifinals of the Grade-1 Loy Yang Traralgon International. Followed with this, she reached another Grand Slam singles final, at the Australian Open, but failed to become Grand Slam champion, losing to Taylor Townsend. Her last tournament was the French Open, where she finished as quarterfinalist. She won five singles titles in total on the ITF Junior Tour.

Professional career

2009–11: First steps
Putintseva turned pro in 2009 at the age of 14. Her first tournament was the Luxembourg Open, where, as a wildcard player, she reached the final stage of qualifying, but failed to reach the main draw. Her next tournament was a $10k event in Amiens in March 2010 where she reached her first semifinal. In October 2010, she made her debut at the WTA Tour at the Luxembourg Open, but lost to Angelique Kerber in the first round. In May 2011, she won her first ITF title at the $25k event in Moscow. Soon after that, she won another $25k event, this time in Samsun, and then the $50k Tatarstan Open, defeating Caroline Garcia in the final.

2012–15: Years of improvements, federation switch

Putintseva switched to representing Kazakhstan instead of Russia in 2012. During the 2012 season, she made improvements and won the $25k Launceston International, followed by semifinals of the $25k event in Almaty. She then recorded her first match win on the WTA Tour, defeating Karen Barritza in the first round, but then lost to former world No. 1, Jelena Janković. In May, she won the $100k Cagnes-sur-Mer, defeating Patricia Mayr-Achleitner in the final. She then made her debut in Grand Slam qualifying at the French Open, but failed to reach the main draw. In August, she had her first opportunity to enter the main draw of a Premier 5 tournament, but lost in the second qualifying round of the Cincinnati Open. By the end of the year, she reached two ITF finals, at the $50k Open Nantes Atlantique and the $75k Al Habtoor Challenge, respectively.

In 2013, Putintseva continued to progress. At the Australian Open, she made her Grand Slam main-draw debut, and recorded her first major match win, defeating Christina McHale. In the second round, she lost to Carla Suárez Navarro. At the Qatar Open, she played her first tournament as top-100 player, and made her Premier 5 main-draw debut, but lost to Mona Barthel in the first round. Unlike at the Indian Wells Open, where she failed to qualify, she succeeded at the Miami Open, but lost to qualifier Donna Vekić in the first round. During the 2014 season, Putintseva only reached two quarterfinals on the WTA Tour, at the Swedish Open and Japan Women's Open, as well as one WTA 125 quarterfinal. In 2015, she reached her first WTA semifinal at the Swedish Open and recorded her first top-10 win at the Nuremberg Cup, defeating world No. 10, Andrea Petkovic, in the first round. During the year, she also reached two $100K finals, at the Grand Est Open 88 and the Nanjing Open.

2016–17: French Open quarterfinalist, first WTA final, top 30

Putintseva turned back on the track in 2016. At the Australian Open, she reached her first Grand Slam third round, after two wins in the main draw, including win over former number one, Caroline Wozniacki. Right after that, she reached semifinals of the Taiwan Open, where she lost to Venus Williams. At Indian Wells, after defeating Peng Shuai and Kristina Mladenovic, Putintseva lost to Serena Williams in the third round. In April, she reached her first Premier-level quarterfinal at the Charleston Open, where she again defeated Venus Williams. She followed this with a quarterfinal at the Morocco Open. At the French Open, she reached her first Grand Slam quarterfinal, however, was beaten by Serena Williams. This helped her break through to the top 50 for the first time. She then reached another semifinal, at the Washington Open, but lost to Yanina Wickmayer. At the Pan Pacific Open, she made her second career top-10 win, defeating Madison Keys in the first round.

In the early beginning of the 2017 season, Putintseva reached her first WTA Tour singles final at the St. Petersburg Trophy. On the path to the final, she made two top-10 wins over world No. 8 Svetlana Kuznetsova, and No. 5 Dominika Cibulková, before she lost to Kristina Mladenovic. She then defeated world No. 15 and former top 10 player, Timea Bacsinszky, at the Qatar Open but then lost to Monica Puig. At the French Open, she did not repeat previous year result, losing to Garbiñe Muguruza in the third round. During the year, she also reached quarterfinals at the Nuremberg Cup and Japan Open.

2018–21: Two Grand Slam quarterfinals, first WTA title

Putintseva began 2018 by reaching the second round of the Hobart International, Australian Open, Indian Wells Open and the Istanbul Cup, and the quarterfinals of the Taiwan Open. She then defeated the top-10 player Sloane Stephens in the first round of Nuremberg Cup, but lost in the next round. Putintseva reached another quarterfinal at the French Open, where she lost to Madison Keys. After losses in the second round at Wimbledon and in the quarterfinals of the Washington Open, she reached her second career WTA final, at the Guangzhou Open, but finished runner-up again.

Putintseva had mixed results in the 2019 season. In January, she reached the quarterfinals of the Premier-level Sydney International and recorded a top-10 win over Sloane Stephens in the second round, before she lost to Kiki Bertens. She reached only the second round of the Australian Open and the Indian Wells Open, and the first round of the St. Petersburg Trophy and the Dubai Tennis Championships. She then reached her first Premier Mandatory round-of-16 at the Miami Open. There, she defeated Kirsten Flipkens, Belinda Bencic and Anastasija Sevastova, before she lost to Karolína Plíšková. At the Madrid Open, she reached the third round, but lost to Ashleigh Barty. In May, she won her first WTA singles title at the Nuremberg Cup, after she defeated Tamara Zidanšek in the final. Then, after a first-round loss at the French Open, she reached the quarterfinals of the Premier-level Birmingham Classic, where she defeated the world No. 1, Naomi Osaka. At Wimbledon, she created a big upset in the first round with another victory over Osaka. However, she lost in the second round to Viktorija Golubic. She lost in the early rounds at the Canadian Open, Cincinnati Open and Bronx Open. She reached the third round of the US Open, where she defeated the world No. 13, Aryna Sabalenka. At the Japan Women's Open, she reached the quarterfinals, but this time Osaka gained her revenge, winning in straight sets. Putintseva reached another WTA tournament quarterfinal later in the year, at the Tianjin Open, where she lost to Ons Jabeur.

Putintseva continued with varied results in 2020. During the first half of year, she reached the third round of Australian Open and the Qatar Open as her only significant results. After the WTA Tour was suspended for six months because of the COVID-19 pandemic outbreak, Putintseva returned in August at the Lexington Open, where she defeated Ajla Tomljanović, but then lost to the eventual runner-up, Jil Teichmann. She followed this by reaching the second round of Cincinnati Open, where she lost to Maria Sakkari. She then reached her first US Open quarterfinal, beating the world No. 15, Petra Martić, en route, before she lost to Jennifer Brady. She reached her first Premier-5 quarterfinal at the Italian Open, but then retired against the eventual champion, Simona Halep. She finished the year with an early loss at the French Open, losing to the qualifier Nadia Podoroska in the second round.

Putintseva started her 2021 season at the first edition of the Abu Dhabi Open. Seeded 13th, she reached the third round where she lost to top seed Sofia Kenin. Seeded 26th, she reached a consecutive third round at the Australian Open, her best major result for the season, where she lost to fifth seed Elina Svitolina.

2022: WTA 1000 quarterfinal, third top-3 win
Putintseva started her 2022 season at the Australian Open. Ranked world No. 42, she lost in the first round to Harmony Tan. In February, she played at the Dubai Tennis Championships where she was defeated in the final round of qualifying by Markéta Vondroušová. In Doha, she fell in the first round to 12th seed and two-time champion Victoria Azarenka, despite having a match point in the third set. At the Indian Wells Open, she was eliminated in the second round by 31st seed Viktorija Golubic. At the Miami Open, she reached the third round where she lost to fifth seed Paula Badosa.

Putintseva began clay-court season at the Charleston Open where she lost in the second round to 15th seed and eventual semifinalist, Amanda Anisimova. Playing for Kazakhstan in the Billie Jean King Cup against Germany, Putintseva played one match and won over Angelique Kerber, in three sets. In the end, Kazakhstan won the tie over Germany 3-1. At the İstanbul Cup, she upset sixth seed Ajla Tomljanović, in the quarterfinals. She lost in the semifinals to qualifier Anastasia Potapova. In Madrid, she was beaten in the second round by 14th seed Coco Gauff. Getting past qualifying at the Italian Open, Putintseva upset world No. 10 and eighth seed, Garbiñe Muguruza, in the second round for her ninth career top-ten win. She lost in the third round to world No. 7, ninth seed, and eventual finalist, Ons Jabeur. Ranked world No. 37 at the French Open, she was defeated in the second round by 28th seed Camila Giorgi.

Seeded 16th at the Eastbourne International, Putintseva was ousted from the tournament in the third round by Anhelina Kalinina. Seeded 27th at Wimbledon, she lost in the first round to Alizé Cornet.

At the Canadian Open, she reached only her second quarterfinal at a WTA 1000 level defeating fourth seed and world No. 3, Paula Badosa, by retirement, and Alison Riske. At the same tournament, she also reached quarterfinals in doubles, partnering Sofia Kenin and defeating sixth seeds Jelena Ostapenko and Lyudmyla Kichenok.

2023
Putintseva started her 2023 season at the Hobart International by reaching the quarterfinals. At the Australian Open, she lost in the second round to Karolína Plíšková, in straight sets.
At the Abu Dhabi Open, she qualified into the main draw where she reached the second round defeating Bianca Andreescu but lost after more than a three-hour battle with Beatriz Haddad Maia in a three set match with two tiebreaks.

Career statistics

Grand Slam tournament performance timelines

Singles

Doubles

References

External links

 

1995 births
Living people
Tennis players from Moscow
Russian female tennis players
Kazakhstani female tennis players
Tennis players at the 2010 Summer Youth Olympics
Asian Games medalists in tennis
Tennis players at the 2014 Asian Games
Russian emigrants to Kazakhstan
Naturalised citizens of Kazakhstan
Naturalised tennis players
Kazakhstani people of Russian descent
Asian Games bronze medalists for Kazakhstan
Medalists at the 2014 Asian Games
Olympic tennis players of Kazakhstan
Tennis players at the 2020 Summer Olympics